The American Blimp MZ-3A is a blimp owned by the United States Navy from 2006 to 2017. It is a modified American Blimp Corporation A-170 series commercial blimp and given the USN type/model/series (T/M/S) designation MZ-3A and Bureau Number (BuNo) 167811. After delivery to the Navy, the airship began operations as an advanced flying laboratory used to evaluate affordable sensor payloads, the development of new lighter-than-air (LTA) technologies and general flight support for other related research and development/science and technology (R&D/S&T) projects. It was the last airship to be operated by the U. S. military.

Description
The airship is propeller-driven by two  Lycoming engines, providing a maximum cruise speed of just under .

History
In May 2006, Air Test and Evaluation Squadron TWENTY, Lighter-than-Air Vehicle (LTAV) Detachment (VX-20 LTAV Det) began regular flight operations from Naval Air Engineering Station Lakehurst located in Lakehurst, New Jersey. In 2007 flight operations were halted and the ship stored in Hangar Six at NAES Lakehurst.

In October 2009, the MZ-3A was transferred to the United States Naval Research Laboratory Military Support Division's Scientific Development Squadron One (VXS-1), formerly known as the Flight Support Detachment, located at Naval Air Station Patuxent River, Maryland.

In March 2010 the airship resumed flight operations with test flights at Marine Corps Air Station Yuma, Arizona.

The MZ-3A is a government owned / contractor operated (GOCO) aircraft operated by a civilian contractor, Integrated Systems Solutions, Inc. (ISSI) of California. ISSI currently maintains and operates the vehicle employing Navy approved, highly qualified, commercial blimp pilots to command the airship.

On 5 July 2010, the MZ-3A was re-deployed to the Jack Edwards National Airport in Gulf Shores, Alabama to assist in the Deepwater Horizon oil spill recovery operation.

At a ribbon-cutting ceremony on 26 October 2011 at the Naval Air Warfare Center Aircraft Division, NAES Lakehurst, New Jersey, and in recognition of the Centennial of Naval Aviation, the Navy unveiled a fresh identity for the MZ-3A.  Emblazoned with red, white and blue striped rudders reminiscent of the Navy's airships just prior to World War II, the airship also carries the insignia of the VXS-1 Warlocks and the banner of the U.S. Navy.

In February 2012, four months after its formal acceptance by the Navy, the MZ-3A airship was at Joint Base McGuire-Dix-Lakehurst, New Jersey. It was planned to be deflated and stored, and the program suspended until future missions warranted its re-activation.

In March 2012, days after the decision to suspend, the program got a reprieve for at least another 3–6 months of operations. The MZ-3A was still in operation as of March 2013, providing C4ISR capabilities demonstrations in Florida for U.S. Naval Forces Southern Command/U.S. 4th Fleet.

In October 2017, the MZ-3A was sold by the Navy, being purchased by the Florida-based AirSign Airship Group.

See also
 List of airships of the United States Navy

Notes

References
 Navy Lakehurst Historical Society, "The Airship," April–May 2007, "Navy LATV Unit Honors NLHS, pg 5
 Naval Airship Association, "The Noon Balloon" Summer 2006, "After 44 Years, Lakehurst Back in Lighter-Than-Air Flight Research," posted by the Asbury Park Press, 5 September 2006, by Kirt More, Toms River Bureau, pgs 8–10.

External links

 The Noon Balloon (Naval Airship Association)
 DoD designation system addendum listing MA-3Z
 Local press coverage of start of MZ-3A program

2000s United States experimental aircraft
Airships of the United States Navy
Deepwater Horizon oil spill
MZ-3
Twin-engined pusher aircraft
Ducted fan-powered aircraft